The 2021 World RX of Barcelona-Catalunya was the first round of the eighth season of the FIA World Rallycross Championship. The event was held at the Circuit de Barcelona-Catalunya in Montmeló, Catalonia. The first round of the RX3 class in the 2021 FIA European Rallycross Championship was also held at the event.

Heats

World RX1 Championship

RX2e Championship

European RX3 Championship

Semi-finals

World RX1 Championship

Semi-Final 1

Semi-Final 2

RX2e Championship

Semi-Final 1

Semi-Final 2

European RX3 Championship

Semi-Final 1

Semi-Final 2

Finals

World RX1 Championship

RX2e Championship

European RX3 Championship

Standings after the event

World RX1 Championship

RX2e Championship

European RX3 Championship 

 Note: Only the top five positions are included.

Notes

References 

|- style="text-align:center"
|width="35%"|Previous race:2020 World RX of Catalunya
|width="40%"|FIA World Rallycross Championship2021 season
|width="35%"|Next race:2021 World RX of Sweden
|- style="text-align:center"
|width="35%"|Previous race:2020 World RX of Catalunya
|width="40%"|World RX of Catalunya
|width="35%"|Next race:-
|- style="text-align:center"

Barcelona
World RX, Barcelona
World RX